was a Japanese high school student who was abducted, raped, tortured and then subsequently murdered. The abuse was mainly perpetrated by four male teenagers (Hiroshi Miyano, Jō Ogura, Shinji Minato, and Yasushi Watanabe) over a period of 40 days from 25 November 1988 to 4 January 1989. The crime has been described as the worst case of juvenile delinquency in post-war Japan. The perpetrators' sentences ranged from juvenile detention to 20 years in prison.

Background 

Furuta was born in Misato, Saitama Prefecture. She lived with her parents, her older brother, and her younger brother. As a teenager, she attended Yashio-Minami High School, and worked part-time at a plastic molding factory during after-school hours since October 1988. She did this to save up money for a graduation trip she had planned. Furuta also accepted a job at an electronics retailer, where she planned on working after graduation.

At high school, Furuta was well-liked by her classmates, with high grades and very infrequent absences. She was a popular girl who was considered to be pretty and had dreams of becoming an idol singer. The night she was abducted, Furuta had been looking forward to going home to watch the final episode of the television show  (Dragonfly とんぼ).

At the time of the crime, they used the second floor of Minato's house as a hangout, and had, as chimpira, previously engaged in crimes including purse snatching, extortion, and rape.

Miyano, the leader of the crime, had a history of problematic behavior since elementary school, such as shoplifting and damaging school property. In April 1986, he enrolled in a private high school in Tokyo, though he dropped out the following year. After this, he continued to commit several crimes that escalated over time. At the time of the crime, he had been living with his girlfriend, the older sister of Boy D, Yasushi Watanabe, and was working as a tile worker to save up money to marry her. Dissatisfied with the job's low pay, Miyano became involved with a gangster and frequently committed sex crimes. This delinquent behavior consequently made his girlfriend lose interest in him and end their relationship.

Kidnapping and abuses 
On 25 November 1988, Miyano and Minato wandered around Misato with the intention of robbing and raping local women. At 8:30 p.m., they spotted Furuta riding her bike home after she had finished a shift at her job. Under Miyano's orders, Minato kicked Furuta off her bike and fled the scene. Miyano, under the pretense of witnessing the attack by coincidence, approached Furuta and offered to walk her home safely.

Upon gaining her trust, he raped her in the warehouse, and again in a nearby hotel, threatening to kill her. From the hotel, Miyano called Minato and his other friends, Jō Ogura and Yasushi Watanabe, and bragged to them about the rape. Ogura reportedly asked Miyano to keep her in captivity in order to allow numerous people to sexually assault her. The group had a history of gang rape and had recently kidnapped and raped another girl, whom they released afterward.

Around 3:00 a.m., Miyano took Furuta to a nearby park, where Minato, Ogura, and Watanabe were waiting. They had learned her home address from a notebook in her backpack and told her they knew where she lived, and that Yakuza members would kill her family if she attempted to escape. The four boys overpowered her, took her to a house in the Ayase district of Adachi, and gang-raped her. The house, which was owned by Minato's parents, soon became their regular gang hangout.

On 27 November, Furuta's parents contacted the police about her disappearance. To discourage further investigation, the kidnappers forced her to call her mother three times to convince her that she had run away but was safe and staying with some friends. They also forced Furuta to stop the police investigation.  When Minato's parents were present, Furuta was forced to act as his girlfriend. They dropped this pretense when it became clear that Minato's parents would not report them to the police. Minato's parents later claimed they did not intervene because they were afraid as their own son was increasingly violent toward them.

On the night of 28 November, Miyano invited two other boys, Tetsuo Nakumara and Koichi Ihara, E and F, respectively, to the Minato house. They went to the upstairs room, where Junko was sitting, wearing a long-sleeved T-shirt and a skirt that Miyano had stolen from a clothing store a few days prior. They drank cough medicine, pretending it was drugs, and acted high. Furuta tried to run away, screaming in fear. Miyano grabbed her legs and Ihara put a pillow over her face. The parents were awakened and went to check on the scream to which Minato told them that it was nothing. The group then proceeded to gang-rape Furuta. During this time, she was in a state of unconsciousness, staring at the ceiling without blinking.

The group held Furuta captive in the Minato residence for 40 days, where they repeatedly beat, raped, and tortured her. They also invited other men and teenage boys home and encouraged them to take turns raping her. 

According to the group's statements, the four shaved her pubic hair, forced her to dance to music while naked and masturbate in front of them, and left her on the balcony in the middle of the night with little clothing. They inserted objects into her vagina and anus, including a lit match, a metal rod, and a bottle, and force-fed her with large amounts of alcohol, milk and water. She was also forced to smoke multiple cigarettes at once and inhale paint thinner. In one incident, Miyano repeatedly burned Furuta's legs and arms with lighter fluid. By the end of December, Furuta was severely malnourished after being fed only small amounts of food and eventually only milk. Due to her severe injuries and infected burns, she became unable to go to the downstairs toilet, and became confined to the floor of Minato's room in a state of extreme weakness.

Furuta's appearance was drastically altered from the brutality of the attacks. Her face was so swollen that it was difficult to make out her features. Her body was also severely crippled, giving off a rotting smell that caused the four boys to lose sexual interest in her. As a result, the boys kidnapped and gang-raped a 19-year-old woman who, like Furuta, was on her way home from work.

Murder and investigation 
On 4 January 1989, after losing a game of mahjong against another person the night before, Miyano decided to take his anger out on Furuta by pouring lighter fluid on her body and setting her on fire. Furuta allegedly made attempts to put out the fire, but gradually became unresponsive. They continued to punch her, ignited a candle and dripped hot wax on her face, placed two short candles on her eyelids, and forced her to drink her own urine. After she was kicked, she fell onto a stereo unit and collapsed into a fit of convulsions. Since she was bleeding profusely, and pus was emerging from her infected burns, the four boys covered their hands in plastic bags. They continued to beat her and dropped an iron exercise ball onto her stomach several times. The attack reportedly lasted two hours. Furuta eventually succumbed to her wounds and died.

Less than 24 hours after her death, Minato's brother called to tell him that Furuta appeared to be dead. Afraid of being penalized for murder, the group wrapped her body in blankets and shoved her into a travel bag. They then put her body in a  drum and filled it with wet concrete. Around 8:00 p.m., they loaded it and eventually disposed of the drum in a cement truck in Kōtō, Tokyo. During her captivity, Furuta had mentioned to her captors several times that she regretted not being able to watch the finale episode of Tonbo (Dragonfly とんぼ). Miyano found the videotape of the episode and placed it in the travel bag. As he later explained, it was not because he pitied Furuta, but because he did not want her to return as a ghost and haunt him.

On 23 January 1989, Miyano and Ogura were arrested for the gang-rape of the 19-year-old girl whom they had kidnapped in December. On 29 March, two police officers came to interrogate them, as women's underwear had been found at their addresses. During the interrogation, Miyano believed that one of the officers was aware of his culpability in Furuta's murder. Thinking that Jō Ogura had confessed to the crimes against Furuta, Miyano told the police where to find Furuta's body. The police were initially puzzled by the confession, as they had been referring to the murder of a different woman and her seven-year-old son that had occurred nine days prior to Furuta's abduction, a case which remains unsolved.

The police found the drum containing Furuta's body the following day. She was identified via fingerprints. On 1 April 1989, Ogura was arrested for a separate sexual assault, and subsequently re-arrested for Furuta's murder. The arrest of Watanabe, Minato, and Minato's brother followed. Several other accomplices who participated in abusing and raping Furuta were officially identified, including Tetsuo Nakamura and Koichi Ihara, who were charged with rape after their DNA was found on and inside the victim's body.

Prosecution 
The identities of the defendants were sealed by the court as they were all juveniles at the time of the crime. Journalists from the Shūkan Bunshun (週刊文春) magazine uncovered their identities and published them on the grounds that, given the severity of the crime, the accused did not deserve to have their right to anonymity upheld. All four defendants pled guilty to "committing bodily injury that resulted in death," rather than murder. In July 1990, a lower court sentenced Hiroshi Miyano, the leader of the crime, to 17 years in prison. He appealed his sentence, but Tokyo High Court judge Ryūji Yanase sentenced him to an additional three years in prison. The 20-year sentence is the second-longest sentence given in Japan before life imprisonment. He was 18 years old at the time of Furuta's murder. After his release, Minato moved in with his mother. However, in 2018, Minato was arrested again for attempted murder after beating a 32-year-old man with a metal rod and slashing his throat with a knife.

Yasushi Watanabe, who was originally sentenced to three to four years in prison, received an upgraded sentence of five to seven years. He was 17 at the time of the murder.
For his role in the crime, Jō Ogura served eight years in a juvenile prison before he was released in August 1999. After his release, he took the family name "Kamisaku" when he was adopted by a supporter. He is said to have boasted about his role in the kidnapping, rape and torture of Furuta.

In July 2004, Ogura was arrested for assaulting Takatoshi Isono, an acquaintance he thought his girlfriend may have been involved with. Ogura tracked Isono down, beat him, and shoved him into his truck. Ogura drove Isono from Adachi to his mother's bar in Misato, where he allegedly beat Isono for four hours. During that time, Ogura repeatedly threatened to kill the man, telling him that he had killed before and knew how to get away with it. He was sentenced to seven years in prison for assaulting Isono and has since been released. Ogura's mother allegedly vandalized Furuta's grave, stating the dead girl had ruined her son's life.

Miyano was denied parole in 2004. He was released from prison in 2009. In January 2013, Miyano was re-arrested for fraud. Due to insufficient evidence, he was released without charge later that month.
Nobuharu Minato (now Shinji Minato), who originally received a four-to-six-year sentence, was re-sentenced to five to nine years by Judge Ryūji Yanase upon appeal. He was 16 at the time of the murder. Minato's parents and brother were not charged.

Furuta's parents were dismayed by the sentences received by their daughter's killers and won a civil suit against the parents of Minato, in whose home the crimes were committed. Miyano's mother reportedly paid Junko Furuta's parents ¥50 million (US$425,000) in compensation, as ordered by the civil court, after selling their family home.

Aftermath 
Junko Furuta's funeral was held on 2 April 1989. One of her friends' memorial address stated:

Furuta's intended future employer presented her parents with the uniform she would have worn in the position she had accepted. The uniform was placed in her casket. At her graduation, Furuta's school principal presented her a high school diploma, which was given to her parents. The location near where Furuta's body was discovered has been developed since and is now Wakasu park.

At the time Japanese people were concerned about a US-influenced epidemic of violent crime, what they called the "American disease".

At least three books have been written about the crime. Yujin Kitagawa (later a member of the music duo Yuzu) played the role of the principal culprit, and Mai Sasaki played the role of Furuta. The case was also the inspiration for the film Concrete in 2004, where Miyano's name was changed to Tatsuo Oosugi, portrayed by Japanese Former Actor Sousuke Takaoka and Furuta's name was changed into Misaki and is portrayed by Japanese Porn Actress Miki Komori, and the manga 17-sai.

See also 

 Hello Kitty murder case
 Murder of Suzanne Capper
 Murder of Sylvia Likens

References

External links 
Court document (Archive) 

1980s missing person cases
1989 murders in Japan
1989 in Tokyo
1989 murders in Asia
Adachi, Tokyo
Child abduction in Japan
Deaths by person in Japan
Female murder victims
Formerly missing people
Incidents of violence against girls
Incidents of violence against women
January 1989 crimes
January 1989 events in Asia
Missing person cases in Japan
Murder committed by minors
Murder in Tokyo

Rape in Japan
Rape in the 1980s
Torture in Japan
Violence against women in Japan